Kalena Bovell is an American conductor. As of 2020, Bovell, who has both African-American and Hispanic ancestry, was the only conductor in the United States of African-American and Hispanic descent. She is currently assistant conductor of the Memphis Symphony Orchestra.

Biography 
Bovell grew up in Los Angeles after her parents moved there from Panama. She began singing at the age of nine and came to classical music when she joined a beginning strings class at age eleven. Being seven years self taught, her first private lesson occurred when she was 18. Bovell played the violin. She discovered her love of conducting as a sophomore at Chapman University which she graduated from in 2009. She attended graduate school at the Hartt School.

Work 
Bovell has worked as the orchestra director at the Loomis Chaffee School and in 2015 staged the Swan Princess, an adaptation of Swan Lake by Tchaikovsky.

In 2017, the Chicago Tribune wrote that her skill at conducting Slavonic Dances: Opus 46 No. 2 and Opus 72 No. 7 by Antonín Dvořák was "brilliant".

Bovell became the assistant conductor for the Memphis Symphony Orchestra in 2019.  Bovell is the only African-American and Hispanic conductor in the United States.

References

External links 

Moody Minute with Kalena Bovella

American conductors (music)
Women conductors (music)
African-American classical musicians
People from Los Angeles
American violinists
Chapman University alumni
University of Hartford Hartt School alumni
Living people
Year of birth missing (living people)
21st-century African-American people